Taxi Driver is a 1976 Martin Scorsese film.

Taxi Driver may also refer to:
 Taxicab driver

Films and television
 Taxi Driver (1954 film), an Indian Hindi film directed by Chetan Anand
 Taxi Driver (1977 film), an Indian Malayalam film
 Taxi Driver (1978 film), an Indian Tamil film
 Taxi Driver: Oko Ashewo, a 2015 film starring Odunlade Adekola and Femi Jacobs
 A Taxi Driver, a 2017 South Korean film
 Taxi Driver (Israeli TV series), a 2010–2012 Israeli comedy-drama television series
 Taxi Driver (South Korean TV series), a 2021 South Korean television series

Music
 Taxi Driver (Dynamic Duo album), a 2004 album by Dynamic Duo
 Taxi Driver (Rkomi album), a 2021 album by Rkomi
 "Taxi Driver" (song), by Gym Class Heroes
 "Taxi Driver", a song by Guitar Wolf from UFO Romantics
 "Taxi Driver", a song by Hanoi Rocks from Self Destruction Blues
 "Taxi Driver", a reggae song by Steel Pulse
 “Taxi Driver”, an afrobeat song by Amerado